Miriochrus minimus is a species of beetle in the family Cerambycidae, the only species in the genus Miriochrus.

References

Acanthoderini